Zahedan Airport  (Balochi: زاہدان بالی پَٹ) is an international airport located in 6 kilometers northeast of the city of Zahedan, Sistan and Baluchestan Province, in south of Iran. The airport has flight connections to  different parts of Iran and countries of south of Persian Gulf.

Airlines and destinations

See also
Iran Civil Aviation Organization
Transport in Iran
List of airports in Iran
List of the busiest airports in Iran
List of airlines of Iran
Zahedan
Iran

References

Airports in Iran
Airport
Buildings and structures in Sistan and Baluchestan Province
Transportation in Sistan and Baluchestan Province